Riama meleagris, the brown lightbulb lizard, is a species of lizard in the family Gymnophthalmidae. It is endemic to Ecuador.

References

Riama
Reptiles of Ecuador
Endemic fauna of Ecuador
Reptiles described in 1885
Taxa named by George Albert Boulenger